Purveyance was an ancient prerogative right of the English Crown to purchase provisions and other necessaries for the royal household, at an appraised price, and to requisition horses and vehicles for royal use. It was finally abolished in 1660.

History

Under Edwards I–III

The right was developed in England over the course of the late eleventh through the fourteenth centuries. In theory, the king's prerogative allowed him to collect goods needed for both household and military use, but the latter was discontinued in 1362. The primary problem with the system was that it was open to abuse from corrupt officials, who would often requisition goods and sell them for profit or use extortion and other means to obtain items or money that was not passed on or divulged to the king. Accordingly, English kings established numerous, though somewhat ineffectual, statutes in an attempt to limit the corruption.

When Edward I and the English Army invaded Scotland, with little agricultural productivity, they used purveyances. The English court had, of old, a right of customary purchase of food for the poor. The right was called prise. Edward took this and grossly expanded it to make the institution called purveyance. The sheriffs would buy food at a set price in the shires and the sellers had to sell at the government price. The government then created a system to store the food. Edward created a convoy system to move mountains of food from the English Midlands to southern Scotland, which the English controlled. Administrative historians say this was a real triumph in organizational power of government, but also a racket because Edward paid late and low.

Edward I also employed purveyances for his many Welsh campaigns, utilizing the produce of both the Isle of Anglesey and Ireland. Purveyance was largely the cause for intense dissatisfaction over Edward's campaign in Gascony of 1294–8, and in 1298, a nationwide investigation was held into abuses of royal administrators, including purveyors.

Purveyance continued to be the favoured method of the English kings for obtaining food and other necessities for feeding their armies, supplying their castles and garrisons, and supporting their itinerant households. Both Edward II and Edward III used the system heavily: the former in his unsuccessful campaign against Scotland and then in the civil war against Thomas of Lancaster and the latter in his relatively successful campaign against Scotland and then in France during the Hundred Years' War.

It was under Edward III that the issue of corruption and abuses that accompanied the collection of goods for military use particularly came to a head. Complaints reached such a feverish pitch in the opening years of the Hundred Years' War that Edward III launched another nationwide investigation, and effectively removed most purveyors from office. However, purveyance was too valuable a royal privilege to surrender, and it was only in 1362, under intense pressure from Parliament, that Edward III agreed to discontinue purveyance for military use.

Under Henry V

When Henry V was preparing for war against France during the Hundred Years' War, he ordered the continuance of purveyance for military purposes, but with the supposed order for all purveyors to be fair and reasonable, not to take any goods from church property, and to pay a fair price. However, many of the purveyors behaved notoriously badly, extorting many foodstuffs from the peasants and either buying at a low price and selling at a high price for a profit, or not paying at all.
Faced by a purveyor with armed men backing him, most peasants did not dare to resist. King Henry, acknowledging the corruption of his purveyors, included in a proclamation that anyone harassed or aggrieved by any captain or soldier should present themselves to the seneschal of the king's treasury. Complete justice, the king proclaimed, would be given on his arrival at Southampton. The retention of purveyance as a tool for supplying the growing royal household would eventually come under fire with the Stuarts.

Abolition

In the 17th century, purveyance was worth about £40,000 per year to the crown. However, Parliament wanted to put an end to it, though James I would not relinquish that control without financial compensation. Parliament feared this would lead only to further corruption and no changes were made to the system during the reign of James I. During the Commonwealth an Act for taking away Purveyance and compositions for Purveyance was passed 12 December 1656 and given assent 9 June 1657. Since all laws of that period were declared null and void upon the Restoration, it would be the Tenures Abolition Act 1660, which finally abolished purveyance and other feudal charges.

See also
Eminent domain

References

Real property law
English property law
Medieval English law
English monarchy
Corruption in the United Kingdom
Eminent domain
Monarchy and money